Kalat Nakalat is a Marathi movie released on 11 December 1989. Produced by Smita Talwalkar and directed by Kanchan Nayak.

Cast 
Vikram Gokhale as Manohar Desai
Savita Prabhune as Uma Desai 
Ashok Saraf as Chotu
Ashwini Bhave as Manisha
Nilu Phule as Nana Garud
Sulabha Deshpande as Chotu and Uma's mother
Mrunmayee Chandorkar as Chhakuli
Omey Ambre as Bachhu
Raja Mayekar as Office Staff
Nandini Jog as Chhotu's Wife
Chandu Parkhi as Office Staff
Ravindra Mahajani as Guest Appearance

Plot
Manohar and Uma are a happily married couple with two children. One day, Uma learns about her husband's extra marital affair and decides to leave him taking the kids along with her. The climax is as expected, not before couple of roller coaster rides in the story.

Soundtrack
The music has been provided by Anand Modak. Anuradha Paudwal won National Film Awards For Best Female Playback Singer for the song He Ek Reshami Gharate.

"Hey Ek Reshmi Gharte" - Anuradha Paudwal, Ravindra Sathe
"Manat Tujhe Manogat" - Asha Bhosle
"Naka Varcha Ragala" - Ashok Saraf

References

External links 
  Movie Album - smashits.com
  Movie Review - gomolo.com
 IMDB - imdb.com

1989 films
1980s Marathi-language films
Best Marathi Feature Film National Film Award winners
Films scored by Anand Modak